McKaley Nicole Miller (born May 14, 1996) is an American actress. She is best known for her recurring teenager roles as Dana Monohan on the ABC series The Gates in 2010 and as Rose Hattenbarger on The CW series Hart of Dixie from 2011 to 2015.

Career
Miller was born in Texas. Her first notable acting role was in the 2006 television film Inspector Mom starring Danica McKellar. She also appeared in a few independent films. In 2011, Miller appeared as Talia in a three episode stint on the Disney Channel sitcom Wizards of Waverly Place, as the love interest to Jake T. Austin's character Max Russo.

She co-starred in the 2013 film The Iceman, playing the daughter of Winona Ryder's character. In 2014, she appeared in the short-lived sitcom Partners, playing the step-daughter of Kelsey Grammer's character. She also guest starred on the MTV series Awkward as a love interest for Matty Mckibben. In 2015, she guest starred on the series Scream Queens as Sophia.

Early in her career, Miller was also a competitive dancer, with more than six years of experience in jazz, hip hop, clogging, tap, lyrical and ballet.

Filmography

References

External links

1996 births
Living people
21st-century American actresses
Actresses from Texas
American child actresses
American film actresses
American television actresses